Far from Home is a 1975 Iranian film directed by Sohrab Shahid-Saless. It was entered into the 25th Berlin International Film Festival.

Cast
 Parviz Sayyad as Husseyin
 Cihan Anasai as Student
 Muhammet Temizkan as Kasim
 Hüsamettin Kaya as Osman
 Imran Kaya as Osmans Frau
 Sakibe Kaya as Osmans Tochter
 Wurdu Püsküllü
 Ursula Kessler as Alte Frau
 Renate Derr as Frau im Park
 Stanislaus Solotar as Arbeiter in der Kantine
 Heinz Bernard as Arbeiter in der U-Bahn

References

External links

1975 films
1975 drama films
Iranian drama films
Films directed by Sohrab Shahid-Saless
1970s Persian-language films
Films set in West Germany